Cathedraltown is a planned neighbourhood with an estimated population of 3,000 in the City of Markham, just north of Toronto. Cathedraltown was named after the Cathedral of the Transfiguration, around which the neighbourhood was built.

Geography
Cathedraltown is bordered on the north to Major Mackenzie Drive, on the south to Elgin Mills Road, on the west to Victoria Square Boulevard, and on the east to Highway 404.

History
The land occupied by Cathedraltown was originally farmland owned by Romandale Farms, a breeder and exhibitor of Holstein cows. Stephen B. Roman, the late founder of Romandale Farms, built the Cathedral on land he donated. In the early 2000s, his daughter, Helen Roman-Barber, working with Donald Buttress, Surveyor of the Fabric Emeritus of Westminster Abbey, developed the design concept for Cathedraltown, based on European cathedral towns.

The neighbourhood's first residents moved in by 2006 with the completion of homes north of the Cathedral. Since then, single- and multi-family housing and mixed-use condominiums have been built to the west and south of the Cathedral.

Architecture and art

Designed under the direction of Donald Buttress, Cathedraltown reflects the Regency and Georgian architecture that was popular in London in the late 18th an early 19th centuries.

In July 2017 a statue of the cow A Brookview Tony Charity was erected in Cathedraltown to some controversy. The statue is of a prize-winning cow that was owned jointly by Romandale Farms and Hanover Hill Farms, in the nearby town of Port Perry, where the cow resided. Romandale Farms donated the statue to honour Charity In October 2017, Markham City Council voted to search for a new location for the statue. , the statue has been taken down and placed in storage until a more suitable and accepted home for Charity can be found.

Public transit
The following bus routes serve the neighbourhood:
 YRT Route #4 / 4A – Major MacKenzie
 YRT Route #24 – Woodbine
 YRT Route #25 – Major MacKenzie
 YRT Route #80 – Elgin Mills
 YRT Route #452 – Richmond Green School Special
 YRT Route #418 - Pierre Elliott Trudeau School Special

References

Neighbourhoods in Markham, Ontario